This alphabetical list of filename extensions contains extensions of notable file formats used by multiple notable applications or services.

0–9

See also
 List of file formats

References

External links
 File Extension Resource
 The File Extensions Resource
 File information site
 File format finder
 List of file types
 File format search engine

 0
 0